Nigel Mitchell is a British television and radio presenter and voice-over artist.

Early life and education

Nigel was born in Kingston Upon Thames. He attended Shrewsbury House School in Surbiton, from where he gained a scholarship to Reed's School in Cobham, Surrey at the age of 11.

Television career

Nickelodeon
Nigel started his TV career as a presenter on the kid's television station, Nickelodeon at the age of 17.

ITV

Nigel left Nickelodeon to present 'Sticky' on CITV. Sticky was a live magazine show produced by 70's TV personality Mick Robertson. The show was co-presented by Gail Porter.

Disney Channel

Nigel went on to Disney Channel in 1997 to host Studio Disney and remained with the channel until the live shows were ended in May 2005. Studio Disney featured live games, callers, special guests and live performances.

Film 24

Nigel was a regular presenter on Sky's Film 24 channel looking at upcoming movies and interviewing the stars before the premieres. Interviews include Kiefer Sutherland, Reese Witherspoon and Robert Pattinson.

Arsenal FC

Nigel works with Arsenal Football Club as the pitch side presenter at Emirates Stadium. He also hosts Arsenal World.

This Morning
Nigel regularly presented The Hub on the ITV morning show

Radio presenting
Information on the radio presenting Nigel has presented during his career.

Heart
Most recently, Nigel has covered shows on the network.

BBC Radio Cambridgeshire
Nigel's broadcast across Cambridgeshire when he covered the afternoon show for Sue Dougan, Bank Holidays and the Saturday Summer Sport programme.

Fox FM
Nigel worked for Fox FM in Oxford during 2008.

Capital Disney
Nigel hosted the breakfast show when Capital Disney launched in 2002 and throughout Capital Disney's time on air he also hosted live shows across the weekend and 'The Friday Afternoon Thing.'  Producer, Andrew Rendle, nicknamed Radio Rendle, was part of the show every weekend.

Kingston FM
Whilst at school Nigel was given the chance to host his own shows on Kingston FM, Palace FM and then later on Thames FM when it was awarded a full-time licence in 1997. The station was run by former Thames TV Producer Dave Mason and the Chairman of this station was David Jacobs. Nigel once told the story of how David Jacobs came into the studio whilst Nigel was on-air and questioned why he did his shows standing up! This radio station is now called Radio Jackie.

Trivia
Guinness Book of World Records

As part of Wish Upon a Star, another short programme for Disney Channel, Nigel Mitchell and Cial Turner travelled on six track rides at Universal Studios Port Aventura, Barcelona, Spain covered a distance of 4,302.03m (14,114 ft 1.2 inches) in 46 minutes and 22 seconds. Still the world record, four years later.

Nigel also attempted a world record attempt for stacking pancakes at the Disney Channel studio.

Producer of Capital Disney radio show Andrew Rendle, nicknamed Radio Rendle or told on radio show that when he first met Nigel, Nigel wore cardigans and tank tops, and Nigel based his hair on Jason Donovan.

Footnotes

External links

Nigel Mitchell Fan Club

British television presenters
Living people
1978 births
People educated at Reed's School